András Várhelyi (21 October 1953 – 15 August 2022) was a Hungarian writer and politician. A member of the Independent Smallholders, Agrarian Workers and Civic Party, he served in the National Assembly from 1998 to 2002.

Várhelyi died on 15 August 2022, at the age of 68.

References 

1953 births
2022 deaths
Hungarian politicians
Independent Smallholders, Agrarian Workers and Civic Party politicians
Hungarian writers
People from Heves County
Members of the National Assembly of Hungary (1998–2002)
21st-century Hungarian politicians